EverSpark Interactive is a technology company from Atlanta, Georgia. The company is best known for search engine optimization, and has been featured in The Washington Post, The Wall Street Journal, and Business News Daily. The company also consults on digital marketing and website development. It was co-founded by Jason Hennessey and Chris Watson in 2009, Hennessey as the chief executive officer for the company. In 2014, the company announced the JJ Hennessey Honorary Epilepsy Scholarship.

In 2015, co-founder and CEO Jason Hennessey sold his stake in the company to Chris Watson, leaving the company and pursuing other endeavors.

References

Further reading
Washington Post: What Google+ can do for small business by Jason Hennessey
Wall Street Journal: Preparing for a Double Dip

Companies based in Atlanta
Digital marketing companies of the United States
Technology companies established in 2009